Academia is the scholarly sector of an academy.

Academia may also refer to:

 Academia.edu, a social network
 La Academia, a Mexican television programme
 La Academia (Paraguay), a Paraguayan spin-off
 La Academia USA, an American spin-off
 Academia (Soviet publishing house), a Soviet publishing house
, operated by Czech Academy of Sciences
 Platonic Academy, or Akademia, an ancient school founded by Plato

See also

 Acidemia
 Academic (disambiguation)
 Academy (disambiguation)
 Akademija (disambiguation)